Thorolf Rafto (July 6, 1922 – November 4, 1986) was a human rights activist and professor in Economic History at the Norwegian School of Economics in Bergen, Norway. The Rafto Foundation for Human Rights was established in gratitude for his efforts and inspiration.

Personal life
Thorolf Rafto was born in Bergen, Norway.  His father, Robert Rafto was an Olympic gymnast and the winner of the Norwegian decathlon championships in 1918. In his younger days Rafto competed on national level in athletics, and won the Norwegian championships in decathlon in 1947. During World War II, Thorolf Rafto fled to Britain and served with the Royal Norwegian Air Force. Back in Bergen after the war, he earned university degrees in Languages and History. In 1950, at the age of 28, Rafto married Helga Hatletvedt with whom, he had four children. In 1956, Thorolf Rafto became a lecturer at the Norwegian School of Economics in Bergen.

Activism
His involvement in political activism in Eastern Europe started with the Prague Spring of 1968. Later in his life, Rafto got, particularly, supportive of the liberal ideas of the Czechoslovak reformists such as Alexander Dubček and Jiří Hájek. In 1973, Rafto travelled to Odessa, where he witnessed the persecution of intellectuals and Soviet Jewish refuseniks, who had applied for emigration to Israel. On the return from the Soviet Union, Rafto wrote an article criticizing internal Soviet politics in Italy's Corriere della Sera, that later was published in Norway and Denmark.  In 1979, Rafto traveled again to Prague to hold a lecture for students excluded from the universities for political reasons. He was abused and later imprisoned by the security police which may have caused him lasting health damage. In 1981, Rafto made several trips to Poland to work closer with labour organisations there. By 1985 his health was weakening. In 1986, Thorolf Rafto died at 64 years of age.

Rafto Foundation and  Rafto Prize
After the death of Thorolf Rafto, his friends and colleagues agreed to establish the Rafto Foundation for Human Rights  (Raftostiftelsen) which would continue  Rafto’s work on a promotion of freedom of speech and political expression in Eastern Europe. It was also decided to introduce the Thorolf Rafto Memorial Prize (Raftoprisen) for human right activists.

The fall of the Iron Curtain and the consequential democratization of Eastern European states caused reconsider of the mission of the foundation. It also opened new possibilities to work with other geographical regions in a promotion of human rights.  The initial idea of the Rafto Prize is to provide a basic informative platform for the laureates that would help to receive further attention from the international media and support from political and non-political organisations.

By awarding the Rafto Prize, the Rafto Foundation for Human Rights seeks to bring attention to independent voices that due to oppressive and corrupt regimes are not always heard. In 1990, the Rafto Prize was awarded to a Burmese democratic leader, Aung San Suu Kyi who in the following year 1991 received the Nobel Peace Prize for her non-violent struggle for democracy and human rights. Four Rafto Laureates have subsequently received further international assistance and were awarded the Nobel Peace Prize. Aung San Suu Kyi, José Ramos-Horta, Kim Dae-jung and Shirin Ebadi were awarded the Rafto Prize prior to the Nobel Peace Prize.

References

Other sources
Per Egil Hegge (2016) Fear Shall Not Triumph: The Rafto Prize - 30th Anniversary   (Bergen: Fagbokforlaget)  
Atle M. Skjærstad (2016) Uværet som aldri stilnet (Bergen: Vigmostad & Bjørke AS)

External links
Rafto Prize website

1922 births
1986 deaths
University of Oslo alumni
Royal Norwegian Air Force personnel of World War II
Norwegian activists
Norwegian decathletes
Academic staff of the Norwegian School of Economics
20th-century  Norwegian economists
Norwegian human rights activists
Norwegian expatriates in the United Kingdom